Qu Donghai (born 28 December 1973) is a Chinese cross-country skier. He competed in the men's 10 kilometre classical event at the 1998 Winter Olympics.

References

1973 births
Living people
Chinese male cross-country skiers
Olympic cross-country skiers of China
Cross-country skiers at the 1998 Winter Olympics
Place of birth missing (living people)
Asian Games medalists in cross-country skiing
Cross-country skiers at the 1996 Asian Winter Games
Cross-country skiers at the 1999 Asian Winter Games
Cross-country skiers at the 2003 Asian Winter Games
Asian Games silver medalists for China
Asian Games bronze medalists for China
Medalists at the 1996 Asian Winter Games
Medalists at the 2003 Asian Winter Games